The Coosawhatchie Formation is a Miocene geologic formation with an outcrop in North Florida. It is within the Hawthorn Group.

Age
Period: Neogene
Epoch: Miocene ~23.03 to 5.33 mya, calculates to a period of 
Faunal stage: Arikareean through Hemphillian

Location
The Coosawhatchie Formation is located on the eastern flank of the Ocala Platform near southern Columbia County and southern Marion County, Florida. It extends south-southeast and is present in Alachua, Marion, Sumter, and Lake County. It is exposed or lies beneath a thin overburden.

Lithography
The Coosawhatchie Formation varies in color from a light gray to olive gray. It is poorly consolidated, variably clayey and phosphate containing sand which occasionally contain a dolomitic component but rarely is it dominated with dolomite or limestone.

Silicified nodules are often present in the sediments and may contain 20% or more phosphate. The permeability factor of the Coosawhatchie sediments is generally low, forming part of the intermediate confining aquifer system.

Members
Charlton Member outcrops in just one location, that being northern Nassau County, Florida near and along the St. Mary's River. Here it consists primarily of light gray to greenish gray, poorly to moderately consolidated, dolomite bearing to calcareous, silty, sandy, with few carbonate beds.

Fossils
Few to no fossils and mostly contained in the Charlton Member.

References
Scott, T. M., The lithostratigraphy of the Hawthorn Group (Miocene) of Florida: Florida Geological Survey Bulletin 59, 148 p. 1988.
Veatch, O., and Stevenson, L. W., 1911, Geology of the coastal plain of Georgia: Georgia Geologic Survey Bulletin 26, 466 p.
USGS: Florida Geology

Neogene Florida
Miocene United States
Miocene Series of North America
Geologic formations of Florida